Shahidabad-e Tang Seh Riz (also Romanized as Shahīdābād-e Tang Seh Rīz) is a village in Sarrud-e Shomali Rural District, in the Central District of Boyer-Ahmad County, Kohgiluyeh and Boyer-Ahmad Province, Iran. At the 2006 census, its population was 20, in 4 families.

References 

Populated places in Boyer-Ahmad County